is a 1998 Japanese anime television series produced by NAS and TV Tokyo and animated by Studio Comet. It was immediately followed by a second season titled . In late 2000, Saban Entertainment licensed the series to air on Fox Kids in September 2001 but it did not air for unknown reasons.

Plot
In the future, humans now live on the artificial planet Planet Sharaku, built by Dr. Taishi. The people living on this planet are highly technologically advanced. All inventors are required to have an inventor's license, the license has certain levels (levels C, B, A, and TAISHI level) depending on the evaluation of the inventor.

The story revolves around the life of Kanipan, an inventor that wants to reach TAISHI level in inventor's degree together with his interface robot named Kid. While pursuing his dreams he encounters and confronts villains whom are against AI Robots. They terrorize the citizens by making the robots evil by installing a customized chip. Later on a robotic insect, which overrides the robot's system, is used.

Characters

 (Japanese)
Kanipan is a 10-year-old IT engineer and hero of the story.

 (Japanese)
Kid is Kanipan's interface robot.

 (Japanese)

 (Japanese)
Milk is a 10-year-old rich young girl and famous superstar idol in Sharaku.

 (Japanese)
Milk's interface robot and her personal butler.

 (Japanese)

Dr. Taishi
 (Japanese)

Episodes

Season 1

Season 2

Music
Opening Themes
"LOVE LOVE Phantasy"
Lyrics by Hero Matsui and Keichi Ueno
Composition and arrangement by Keichi Ueno
Performed by Whoops!!

""
Lyrics by Ohta Shinichirou & Hata Hideki
Composition and arrangement by Ohta Shinichirou, Kobayashi Masamichi & Arai Yasunori
Performed by BAAD

Ending Themes

Lyrics by Suzi Kim
Composition and arrangement by Hero Matsui
Performed by Whoops!!

"O·K!"
Lyrics by Akihito Tokunaga & Terukado Ohnishi
Composition and arrangement by XL
Performed by XL

References

External links

1998 anime television series debuts
1999 anime television series debuts
Japanese children's animated science fiction television series
TV Tokyo original programming